Genevieve Mina (born 1996) is an American politician serving as a member of the Alaska House of Representatives for the 19th district. Elected in November 2022, she assumed office on January 17, 2023.

Early life and education 
Mina was born and raised in Alaska, the daughter of immigrants from the Philippines. She studied political science and biology at the University of Alaska Anchorage.

Career 
Mina began working as a legislative intern in the Alaska Legislature in 2017. She later worked in the offices of Ivy Spohnholz and Eric Croft. Mina was elected to the Alaska House of Representatives in November 2022.

References 

Living people
Alaska Democrats
American politicians of Filipino descent
People from Anchorage, Alaska
Politicians from Anchorage, Alaska
Women state legislators in Alaska
Members of the Alaska House of Representatives
1996 births